Ulrica, also spelled Ulrika, is a female given name of Germanic origins. Its male equivalent is Ulric, Ulrich or Ulrik.

Ulrike and Ulrikke are alternative names derived from Ulrica. 

Ulrica may refer to:

People
 Ulrika Eleonora, Queen of Sweden (1688–1741)
 Ulrica Elisabeth von Liewen (1747–1775), rumored parent (along with King Adolf Frederick of Sweden) of Lolotte Forssberg
 Ulrika Åberg (1771–1852), Swedish ballerina
 Ulrica Arfvidsson (1734–1801), Swedish fortune teller
 Ulrika Björn (born 1973), Swedish footballer
 Ulrika Ericsson, Playboy Playmate of the Month for November 1996
 Ulrika von Fersen (1749–1810), Swedish socialite, a known figure of the Gustavian age, the inspiration of a poem 
 Ulrika Jonsson (born 1967), Swedish personality on British television
 Ulrika Knape (born 1955), Swedish diver
 Ulrika Melin (1767–1834), Swedish artist 
 Ulrika Pasch (1735–1796), Swedish painter
 Ulrika Eleonora Stålhammar (1688–1733), Swedish soldier
 Ulrika Ulla Stenberg (1774–1854), Swedish artist 
 Ulrika von Strussenfelt (1801–1873), Swedish writer
 Ulrika Ulla Tessin (1711–1768), Swedish lady in waiting, writer and dilettante artist
 Ulrika Widström (1764–1841), Swedish poet
 Ulrica Wilson, African-American mathematician

Fictional characters
 Ulrica, in Walter Scott's 1819 novel Ivanhoe and in the 1891 opera Ivanhoe
 Ulrica, in Verdi's 1859 opera Un ballo in maschera
 Sister Ulrica, a nun in the 1980s TV series Tenko
 Ulrica, the title character of the short story "Ulrikke" (original Spanish title: "Ulrica"), by Jorge Luis Borges

See also
 Ulrike, given name
 Ulrikke, given name

Swedish feminine given names
Feminine given names